Jaggu Vakulabhushana was an eminent Sanskrit poet and writer. He was born Alwar Iyengar in 1902 at Chatraghosha near Melukote, India   (Vakulabhushana was his pen name) and died in 1994. He was awarded the Sahitya Academy award for his seminal work "Jayantika".

Works

Sanskrit works
 Jayantika-Gadyakavya, based on Bana's Kadambari (1990)
 Yaduvamsacaritam – Gadyakavya based on Bana's Harsacarita
 Adbhutadutam an epic in 15 cantos, based on Udyaogaparvan on the Mahabharata (1968),
 Karunarasatarangini- Khandakavya,
 Patikoktimala – poetry,
 Srngaralilamrtam – poetry
 Kalikautukam – an unpublished Khandakavya,
 Gitaraghavam – poetry
 Vasantavatamsavarnanam – Khandakavya
 Bharatasamgrahah – Campu
 Yatirajacampu – Campu
 Yatrodantacampu – Campu
 Laksmistutimanjari – devotional poem,
 Hayavadanastotram – devotional poem,
 Amrtadhirohini – devotional poem,
 Aghavighatini – devotional poem, on Rama; (unpublished)
 Laksmidandakah – devotional poetry,
 Yadusailasatakam – Satakakavya,
 Gandhinutih – poem, unpublished;
 Kodandaramasuprabhatam – devotional poetry,
 Vasudevasuprabhatam – devotional poetry, (unpublished);
 Dasarathisuprabhatam – devotional poetry, (unpublished);
 Subrahmanyasuprabhatam – devotional poetry, (unpublished);
 Madhyaranganathastotram – devotional poetry, (unpublished)
 Madhyaranganathasuprabhatam – devotional poetry, (un-published);
 Madhyaranganathasatanamastotram – devotional poetry,(unpublished);
 Madhyaratiganayiksuprabhatam – devotional poetry, (unpublished);
 Mahalaksmisuprabhatam – devotional poetry,
 Sriyoganrsimhasuprabhatam – devotional poetry,
 Sriyoganrsimhamangalastotram – devotional poetry,
 Srimallesvarakrsnasuprabhatam – devotional poetry,
 Srimallesvarakrsnamangalam – devotional poetry,
 Madhyajanardana suprabhatam – devotional poetry,
 Janardanasumangalam – devotional poetry,
 Venkataryavandanam –- devotional poetry,
 Prapannavani- devotional poetry,
 Adbhutamsukam – play, (precursor to Venisamhara of Bhattanarayana)
 Pratijnakautilyam – play, (precursor to Mudrarakshasa of Vishakhadatta)
 Prasannakasyapam-play,(successor of Abhijnanasakuntala of Kalidasa)
 Karmahalam – play, unpublished,
 Maniharanam – play, (successor of Bhasa's Urubhanga)
 Maiijulamaiijiram – play
 Balivijayam –play,
 Amulyamalyam – play,
 Yauvarajyam – play,
 Pratijñåśāntanavam – play,
 Anangadāprahasnam – a farce,
 Samyuktā – a play,
 Nighnatāpasam – a play, 1982
 Navajīmūtam – a play 1986,
 Mugdhakuntalam – play, 1993
 Prabuddhaprajñam. Play 1993
 Kaumudīyam – play, 1993
 Vīrasaubhadram – play, precursor to Dūtaghatotkaca of Bhāsa
 Vrataphalam – play, 1993
 Kalikālusyam – play, 1993
 Dāśarathidarśanam – play, 1993
 Vitīrnāmrtam – play, 1993
 Syamantakam – play, 1993
 Maireyapāramyam – play, 1993

Critical works
 Bhāvakaumudī – (Commentary on the play Kādambarīkalyāna)
 Upākhyānaratnamañjūsā – Commentary on Kshemendra's Cārucaryā

Miscellaneous works
 Kanakamuktāmani
 Shringerī śankarāryasvāgatam
 Samasyāpūranāni
 Suvarnānyoktipañcakam
 Cātuślokāh
 Anyoktimālā, (unpublished);
 Adbhutavijñāpannam,
 Prasannakāśyapavijñaptih
 Syamantakavijñaptih
 Pratijñākautilyvijñaptih(unpublished);
 Yaduvamśa-caritavijñaptih

Translations
 Srīvacanabhūshanam – (from Sanskrit into Kannada)
 Caramupāyanirnayah

Other works
 Laksmīdāsasāhiyam
 Ajñātagranthāh

Works in Kannada
 Naguvintagantu (Autobiographical comic story),
 Rādhāmohan – Cine-play,
 Rāmjīrangsthola – comic essays,
 Melunadina Bhāgyodaya,
 Ambarīsacarita,
 Bhagavatya-daśaka,
 Vedāntavū Sāhityavū,
 Janārdasuprabhātopodgātha,
 Māhālakshmīsuprabhātopodgātha,
 Srīvacana-bhūśanopodgātha,
 Amrtādhirohinīsuprabhātopodgātha,
 Padmapurāna (translation of 3 chapters – unpublished),
 Gītopanyāsa,
 Rāmāyanopanyasa.

Awards and recognition
 Sahitya Akademi award for creative writing in Sanskrit.
 President's certificate of honour.

References

Bibliography
 Encyclopedia of Indian Literature, Sahitya Academy, 1988
 Adhunik Sanskrit Natak, Ramaji Upadhyaya, 1977
 Who is who of Sanskrit Scholars in India, Sahitya Academy, 1993

Sanskrit poets